Paul Candler is a British civil servant. Since 2021, he serves as the Commissioner for the British Antarctic Territory (succeeding Ben Merrick), Commissioner for the British Indian Ocean Territory (succeeding Ben Merrick), and Director, Overseas Territories at the Foreign, Commonwealth and Development Office.

Before joining the FCDO, Candler was Director of International, Rights and Constitutional Policy at the Ministry of Justice.

References 

 https://www.gov.uk/government/people/paul-candler

British civil servants
Commissioners of the British Antarctic Territory
Commissioners of the British Indian Ocean Territory
Year of birth missing (living people)
Living people